is a former Japanese football player. She played for Japan national team.

National team career
Saito was born on March 24, 1965. In October 1984, she was selected Japan national team for tour for China. On October 17, she debuted for Japan against Italy. She played 3 games for Japan in 1984.

National team statistics

References

1965 births
Living people
Japanese women's footballers
Japan women's international footballers
Women's association football goalkeepers